Nick Fury, Agent of Nothing is a story arc in the Marvel Comics series Secret Warriors. It was the first story arc in the Secret Warriors series.

Publication history
The storyline was written by Brian Michael Bendis and Jonathan Hickman.
Nick Fury, Agent of Nothing: Part 1, April 2009
Nick Fury, Agent of Nothing: Part 2, May 2009
Nick Fury, Agent of Nothing: Part 3, June 2009
Nick Fury, Agent of Nothing: Part 4, July 2009
Nick Fury, Agent of Nothing: Part 5, August 2009
Nick Fury, Agent of Nothing: Part 6, September 2009

Plot
Nick Fury, suspicious of the current state of affairs following the dismantling of S.H.I.E.L.D., after the end of the Secret Invasion by the Skrull empire, breaks into The Carousel, a S.H.I.E.L.D. base in Chicago. Information found there leads him to send the Secret Warriors to recon the Black Ice facility in Odessa, TX, where they break cover and battle both HAMMER and HYDRA forces. The HYDRA agents manage to escape and steal a casket containing the remains of the Gorgon. The fact that HYDRA showed up prompts Fury to announce to his team that S.H.I.E.L.D. was evidently working under the control of HYDRA all along.

Meanwhile, in the Ichor HYDRA base, an attack by Skrulls leads Baron von Strucker to destroy the base and regroup the leadership of HYDRA: Kraken (actually Jake Fury, Nick Fury's younger brother), Viper, Madame Hydra (actually Contessa) and The Hive. HYDRA then bring the remains of Gorgon to the Hand where they force the assassin clan to revive Gorgon, taking the life of the Hand Grandmaster in the process.

The Secret Warriors are next sent to evacuate some psi-agents from the Red Worm S.H.I.E.L.D. base but are again confronted by HYDRA. Gorgon cuts off Slingshot's arms during the fight and HYDRA leave with the captive agents. The Secret Warriors seek out a replacement for Yo-Yo and find Eden Fesi - a teleporter living in Australia. Fury goes to the Sudan to recruit the former Howling Commandos soldiers. He assembles an army that attacks The Dock - a S.H.I.E.L.D. base under HAMMER control. During the battle with HAMMER, HYDRA forces again show up, and the Secret Warriors are called to the rescue, allowing Fury to get away with three helicarriers.

Following this event, Madame Hydra and Viper bargain with the Silver Samurai and obtain a mysterious box from Clan Yashida. Kraken orders HYDRA to scan all members for a traitor in their ranks. Fury instructs Dum Dum to start recruiting an army. He reveals to the Secret Warriors that he was not the one who called for their aid in the battle.

Followups
The arc was followed by four others Wake the Beast, The Last Ride of the Howling Commandos, Night and Wheels Within Wheels before the series ended.

Reception
According to Kevin M. Brettauer of PopMatters the revelation that Hydra has been in control of S.H.I.E.L.D. all along caused a great deal of controversy among comic book fans. Brettauer himself stated that it should not have come to too much of a surprise considering the earlier similar occurrences in the Nick Fury vs. S.H.I.E.L.D. from the 1980s. He gave the story a good review and said that it is fitting in the aftermath of 9/11 in the same vein as the modern Daniel Craig series and the Bourne movies. He also expressed that the artwork by Stefano Casselli, is grim and gritty yet somehow tinged with hope in his opinion.

Collected editions

See also
 2009 in comics

References

External links
 Nick Fury, Agent of Nothing at the Comic Book DB
 Nick Fury, Agent of Nothing  Hard Cover at the Comic Book DB
 Nick Fury, Agent of Nothing TPB at the Comic Book DB

Nick Fury titles
Secret Warriors (franchise)